Deli Bejak-e Sefidar (also Romanized as Delī Bejak-e Sefīdār; also known as Delī Bejak and Polī Bejak-e Sefīdār) is a village in Sepidar Rural District, in the Central District of Boyer-Ahmad County, Kohgiluyeh and Boyer-Ahmad Province, Iran. At the 2006 census, its population was 50, in 9 families.

References 

Populated places in Boyer-Ahmad County